Prasaadam is a 1976 Indian Malayalam-language film, directed by A. B. Raj and produced by T. K. Balachandran. The film stars Prem Nazir, Jayabharathi, KPAC Lalitha and Adoor Bhasi. The film's score was composed by V. Dakshinamoorthy.

Cast
 
Prem Nazir as Shankarankutty 
Jayabharathi as Sumathi 
KPAC Lalitha as Bhageerathi 
Adoor Bhasi as Dr. Dussasanan
Sankaradi as Gopalappilla
Sreelatha Namboothiri as nurse
Bahadoor as attender
Janardanan as Sukumaran 
govindankutty as Oochaali Keshavan
muthukulam as broker Pachupilla
Reena as Meenakshi 
TK Balachandran as Chellappan
khadeeja as Shankari

Soundtrack
The music was composed by V. Dakshinamoorthy with lyrics by P. Bhaskaran.

References

External links
 

1976 films
1970s Malayalam-language films